Volksstimme (People's Voice) is the name of several newspapers:

 Volksstimme (Saxony-Anhalt), published in Magdeburg since 1980
 Volksstimme (Austrian newspaper), newspaper of the Communist Party of Austria
 Westungarische Volksstimme
 Elbinger Volksstimme